Orthodes jamaicensis is a moth of the family Noctuidae. It is found on Jamaica.

Taxonomy
Its name Jamaicensis refers to how it mainly inhabits Jamaica.

References

Hadeninae
Moths of the Caribbean
Endemic fauna of Jamaica
Moths described in 1905